Nové Hrady may refer to:

Nové Hrady (České Budějovice District), a town in South Bohemian Region, Czech Republic
Nové Hrady (Ústí nad Orlicí District), a village in Pardubice Region, Czech Republic

See also
 Nove (disambiguation)